Jeremy Holmes (born 1943) is a British psychiatrist and writer.

Life
Jeremy Holmes was born in London in 1943. He trained at Cambridge University and University College London. He practices as a Consultant Psychotherapist in North Devon. He also holds the post of Visiting Professor at University College London (UCL) and was Senior Clinical Research Fellow at Peninsula Medical School until 2003. He is retired and spends time travelling UK giving talks on attachment theory to therapy organizations.

Works
 
 
  - winner of the 2010 Goethe Award for Psychoanalytic and Psychodynamic Scholarship - A book which attempts to bring together attachment theory and modern psychoanalytical theory and demonstrate how attachment theory can be used in psychotherapeutic practice.
 with  Foreword by R. D. Hinshelwood.

References

1943 births
Living people
British psychiatrists